Project: Kill is a 1976 American action film directed by William Girdler and starring Leslie Nielsen before he began doing comedies. It is distributed by Troma Entertainment and Digiview Productions and was filmed in the Philippines in 1975.

Plot
Nielsen plays John Trevor, who for six years has been training and leading a team of highly trained special forces men (Code Name: Project: Kill) whose performance is enhanced by drugs. Over time Trevor realises that his men, who work independently, are being used as assassins rather than to protect government installations and individuals.

Trevor relates his worries to his second-in-command Frank Lassiter (Gary Lockwood), then decides to escape from his secret government base to the Philippines where two of his former comrades in arms reside. However, withdrawal from the mind-control drugs turn Trevor violent and dangerous, and now Lassiter must find him before he can do any real damage. Filipino criminal boss Alok Lee (Vic Díaz) learns of Trevor's arrival and has been paid to capture him and sell him to a foreign power so they may discover and duplicate the drugs and training given to Trevor's force.

Cast
Leslie Nielsen: John Trevor
Gary Lockwood: Frank Lassiter
Nancy Kwan: Lee Su
Vic Silayan: Chief Insp. Cruz
Vic Diaz: Alok Lee
Galen Thompson: Carl Wagner
Maurice Downs: Hook
Pamela Parsons: Lynn Walker
Carlos Salazar: Insp. Ortiz
Franco Zarrate: Lung Set

Soundtrack

The movie features one live song entitled: The Lonely World. The song was written by Sid Wayne.

Home media

The movie was released on DVD in 2004.

Translations
 Finland: Tehtävä: Tapa (video title)
 Finland: Tehtävänä: Tappaa
 U.S.: The Guardian (pre-release title)
 U.S.: Total Control (video title)

External links
 
 
 
 
 Project Kill on William Gilder.com  http://www.williamgirdler.com/projectkill6.html

1976 films
1970s action films
1976 independent films
American spy films
American independent films
Troma Entertainment films
Films directed by William Girdler
Films shot in the Philippines
Films scored by Robert O. Ragland
1970s English-language films
1970s American films